The South Padre Island Invitational was an annual NCAA Men's Basketball early season tournament. The tournament would feature a field of eight teams. The preliminary rounds were held at campus sites, with the third and final rounds held at the South Padre Island Convention Centre. The tournament was usually held over Thanksgiving weekend.

Brackets 
* – Denotes overtime period

2012

2011

2010

2009

2008

November 28–29: South Padre Island Convention Centre

2007

Preliminary round
Preliminary round games played at on-campus sites

Championship Round
November 23–24: South Padre Island Convention Centre

2006

2005

References 

2005 establishments in Texas
2012 disestablishments in Texas
Basketball in Texas
Sports competitions in Texas
College men's basketball competitions in the United States
Recurring sporting events established in 2005
Recurring sporting events disestablished in 2012